Thomas David "Tom" Waldhauser (born December 16, 1953) is a retired United States Marine Corps general who was the Commander of United States Africa Command. He previously served as Director for Joint Force Development, J7 on the Joint Chiefs of Staff, Commanding General, I Marine Expeditionary Force, and Commanding General, United States Marine Forces Central Command. Waldhauser is an alumnus of Bemidji State University.

Military career

Waldhauser was born in South St. Paul, Minnesota, and is a graduate of Bemidji State University. He was commissioned into the United States Marine Corps in 1976 as an infantry officer through the Platoon Leaders Class program via Officer Candidates School.

As a field grade officer, Waldhauser was a Battalion Landing Team Operations Officer and served on the faculty of the Amphibious Warfare School. During the Amphibious Warfare School tour, he deployed to the staff of the Commander, United States Marine Forces Central Command (Forward) during Operation Desert Shield/Desert Storm. 

Waldhauser also served on the II Marine Expeditionary Force staff. He was the Battalion Landing Team Commander of 3rd Battalion, 2nd Marine Regiment. He also had duty at Headquarters, United States Marine Corps, and the Pentagon with the Joint Staff Combating Terrorism Directorate (J-34).

As a colonel, Waldhauser assumed command of the 15th Marine Expeditionary Unit (SOC) in 2000. During this tour, the unit participated in combat operations in Southern Afghanistan for Operation Enduring Freedom and in Iraq for Operation Iraqi Freedom.

Appointed to the rank of brigadier general in 2003, Waldhauser's initial assignments as a general Officer were Commanding General, Marine Corps Warfighting Laboratory, and Deputy Commander, Marine Corps Combat Development Command. From 2006–2007, he served as Chief of Staff, United States Special Operations Command, in Tampa, Florida.

As a major general, Waldhauser commanded the First Marine Division from September 2007 until July 2009.

Promoted to lieutenant general in 2009, Waldhauser served as the Deputy Commandant for Plans Policies, and Operations during 2009–2010. From October 2010 through September 2012, he served as the Commanding General, I Marine Expeditionary Force, and Commanding General, United States Marine Forces Central Command. Waldhauser served as the Senior Military Assistant to the Secretary of Defense from October 2012 through September 2013.

Waldhauser was promoted to general on 18 July 2016 and became the commander of United States Africa Command. He retired in 2019.  

Waldhauser has attended the United States Army Ranger School, Jumpmaster School, Amphibious Warfare School, and Marine Corps Command and Staff College.

Post-military activities 
Since his retirement from the military in 2019, he has held positions on the Board of Governors for the Marine Corps Heritage Foundation, as an Honorary Advisor for Girl Security, and a position as a Fellow at the National Defense University. He serves as a Senior Advisor for Jones Group International as well.

Awards and decorations
Waldhauser's decorations and medals include: 
 

He holds Expert Rifle (4th award) and Expert Pistol (4th award) marksmanship badges. He also earned the U.S. Army Ranger tab.

References

1953 births
Living people
Recipients of the Defense Distinguished Service Medal
United States Marine Corps generals
Twin cities
Military personnel from Minnesota
People from South St. Paul, Minnesota
Bemidji State University alumni